Allium hyalinum is a Californian species of wild onion known by the common name glassy onion.

There are additional populations in the Coast Ranges of Lake, Alameda, Santa Clara, Merced, and San Benito Counties.

Description
Allium hyalinum, the glassy onion, grows from a cluster of bulbs, with each bulb sending up a tall stem.

Atop each stem is an inflorescence of up to 25, but usually fewer, white or pink-tinted white flowers. The flowers have six shiny tepals which become transparent as they age.

formerly included
Allium hyalinum var. praecox (Brandegee) Jeps., now called Allium praecox Brandegee

References

External links

USDA Plants Profile for Allium hyalinum (glassy onion)
Allium hyalinum — UC Photos gallery

hyalinum
Endemic flora of California
Flora of the Sierra Nevada (United States)
Natural history of the California Coast Ranges
Plants described in 1885
Taxa named by Willis Linn Jepson